Arne Borgstrøm (born 19 January 1959) is a retired Norwegian freestyle and medley swimmer.

He was born in Odda. He competed at the 1976 Summer Olympics in Montreal and at the 1984 Summer Olympics in Los Angeles.

He won 73 Norwegian titles and ten Nordic titles between 1976 and 1984.

References

1959 births
Living people
People from Odda
Norwegian male freestyle swimmers
Norwegian male medley swimmers
Olympic swimmers of Norway
Swimmers at the 1976 Summer Olympics
Swimmers at the 1984 Summer Olympics
Sportspeople from Vestland
20th-century Norwegian people